Bellincioni is an Italian surname. Notable people with the surname include:

Bernardo Bellincioni (1452–1492), Italian poet
Gemma Bellincioni (1864–1950), Italian opera singer
Luigi Bellincioni (1842–1929), Italian architect and engineer

Italian-language surnames